The Boston Red Sox are a Major League Baseball (MLB) team based in Boston, Massachusetts. Note that before 1908, the team was known as the Boston Americans. The list below documents players (by careers and seasons) and teams (by seasons) that hold particular club records.

Individual player records
Note that these records reflect statistics only for a player's tenure with the Red Sox. For example, David Ortiz hit a total of 541 home runs during his MLB career; 483 with the Red Sox and 58 with the Minnesota Twins—thus, Ted Williams' 521 home runs, all hit with the Red Sox, is the team record. Similarly, the team record for wins with the Red Sox is 192, accomplished both by Roger Clemens and Cy Young, who had major league career win totals of 354 and 511, respectively.

Note that "rate" categories (such as batting average or earned run average) have thresholds (such as a minimum number of at bats or innings pitched) for eligibility.

The below tables have been updated with records through the  season.

Batting

Source:

Additionally, the team record for consecutive games played with at least one hit (hitting streak) is held by Dom DiMaggio at 34 games, set during the 1949 season. His streak began with a single on June 29 and ended when he went 0-for-5 on August 9; during that period, DiMaggio also appeared in a game on July 18 only as a pinch runner, which neither counts for or against the hitting streak.

Pitching

Source:

Fielding
This is a partial list of the team's single-season fielding records.

Team records
Note: games behind (GB) applies to non-first-place seasons, while games ahead (GA) applies to first-place seasons. The 2005 Red Sox, who finished in a tie for first in the American League East and were declared the Wild Card team based on head-to-head records, are not included in either category.

 These categories exclude the 2020 team that played a 60-game season; the team won 24 games and lost 36 games (a .400 winning percentage); scored 292 runs and allowed 351 runs; and played without fans in attendance due to the COVID-19 pandemic.

 The 1961 and 1985 teams each had a tie game during their 162-game schedule that was subsequently replayed; the 1978 team played a tie-breaker game at the end of their 162-game schedule.

Source:

See also
 List of Major League Baseball franchise postseason streaks
 List of Boston Red Sox awards

References

Records
Boston Red Sox